The Gershwin Piano Concerto is a ballet made on New York City Ballet by its ballet master Jerome Robbins to George Gershwin's 1925 Concerto in F. The premiere took place on February 6, 1982 at the New York State Theater, Lincoln Center, N.Y.

Original cast 

   
 Maria Calegari
 Darci Kistler
 
 Christopher d'Amboise
 Mel Tomlinson

Review 
 NY Times, Anna Kisselgoff, February 6, 1982

Ballets by Jerome Robbins
Piano Concerto, Gershwin
1982 ballet premieres
New York City Ballet repertory